The Adventures of Rocky and Bullwinkle is an American animated comedy streaming television series produced by DreamWorks Animation Television which is a reboot of the 1959–64 animated television series of the same name. It debuted on May 11, 2018, on Amazon Prime Video, being DreamWorks Animation Television's first series to air on a streaming service other than Netflix. Like its preceding spin-off The Mr. Peabody & Sherman Show, animation was outsourced by DHX Media's 2D animation studio in Vancouver, Canada. The second half of the series was released on January 11, 2019.

Premise
The series sees Rocky and Bullwinkle "thrust into harrowing situations but end up saving the day time and again". As Rocky and Bullwinkle's innocent and silly ambitions to become rock stars or find lost treasure end up dovetailing with Fearless Leader's sinister plans to take over the world, our heroes are set on a collision course with his notorious superspies Boris Badenov and Natasha Fatale.

Cast and characters

Main

 Tara Strong as Rocket "Rocky" J. Squirrel
 Brad Norman as Bullwinkle J. Moose
 Ben Diskin as Boris Badenov
 Rachel Butera as Natasha Fatale, Cloyd
 Piotr Michael as Fearless Leader
 Daran Norris as Narrator, Evil Chicken

Recurring

 Fuschia! as Director Peachfuzz
 Ant Simpson as Butler
 Kari Wahlgren as Grandwinkle
 Rhomeyn Johnson as Rafi Tusk
 Tom Kenny as Colonel Boudreaux
 Kevin Michael Richardson as President Leader
 Grey Griffin as Dr. Lesso
 Faruq Tauheed as Mayor Grundstrom 
 Ben Giroux as Francis / Newsie
 Eric Bauza as Premier Leader

Guest

 Lil Rel Howery as Chuckles ("If You Can't Beat 'em, Totem!" or "It's Raining Gems!")
 Cristina Milizia as Thalia ("If You Can't Beat 'em, Totem!" or "It's Raining Gems!")
 Roger Craig Smith as Agent Chad ("See You Laser, Alligaser" or "Goop! There it is")

Playing themselves

 Gordon Ramsay
 Mario Lopez
 "Weird Al" Yankovic
 Mark Hamill

Episodes

Production

Development
On December 10, 2017, it was reported that DreamWorks Animation Television was developing a revival of Jay Ward's The Adventures of Rocky and Bullwinkle and Friends. Animation was expected to be handled by DHX Studios Vancouver with writing and early production duties taking place in Los Angeles.

On April 12, 2018, it was announced that Amazon Prime Video had given a series order to the production and that the show would premiere on May 11, 2018. Executive producers were reported to include Scott Fellows and Tiffany Ward, daughter of the original series producer Jay Ward. On December 15, 2018, it was reported that the series would return with the second half of season one in January 2019. On January 3, 2019, it was announced that these episodes would be released on January 11, 2019.

Casting
Alongside the series announcement, it was confirmed that voice cast would include Tara Strong, Brad Norman, Ben Diskin, Rachel Butera, Piotr Michael, and Daran Norris. Strong takes over the role of Rocky from the late June Foray; this series is the first instance where Rocky is voiced by somebody other than Foray (besides GEICO commercial, where he is voiced by Lauri Fraser) due to her death in 2017.

Release
Alongside the series announcement, the first official trailer was released. On April 27, 2018, four clips from the series were released.

Awards and nominations

References

External links
 
 The Adventures of Rocky and Bullwinkle at Amazon Prime Video
 

2018 American television series debuts
2019 American television series endings
2010s American animated television series
American children's animated comedy television series
American flash animated television series
Animated television series about squirrels
Animated television series reboots
Amazon Prime Video children's programming
Amazon Prime Video original programming
Television series about deer and moose
Television series by DHX Media
Television series by DreamWorks Animation
Television series by Universal Television
The Adventures of Rocky and Bullwinkle and Friends
English-language television shows